George Scott Register (November 27, 1901 – March 18, 1972) was a United States district judge of the United States District Court for the District of North Dakota.

Education and career

Born in Bismarck, North Dakota, Register received an Artium Baccalaureus degree from Jamestown College in 1923 and a Juris Doctor from the University of Michigan Law School in 1926. He was a special assistant state attorney general of North Dakota from 1928 to 1929, and then a state's attorney of Burleigh County, North Dakota from 1929 to 1953. He was in private practice in Bismarck from 1953 to 1955.

Federal judicial service

On June 21, 1955, Register was nominated by President Dwight D. Eisenhower to a new seat on the United States District Court for the District of North Dakota created by 68 Stat. 8. He was confirmed by the United States Senate on July 22, 1955, and received his commission on July 27, 1955. He served as Chief Judge from 1955 to 1971, assuming senior status on December 22, 1971. Register served in that capacity until his death in Bismarck on March 18, 1972.

References

Sources
 

1901 births
1972 deaths
Judges of the United States District Court for the District of North Dakota
United States district court judges appointed by Dwight D. Eisenhower
20th-century American judges
University of Michigan Law School alumni
20th-century American lawyers